The Vishansar Lake is an alpine high-elevation oligotrophic lake, situated near Sonamarg in the Ganderbal district of Jammu and Kashmir, India, at an elevation of . It has a maximum length of 1 km, and maximum width of 0.6 km.

Etymology and geography
Vishansar, in Kashmiri, means the lake of Vishnu. This lake holds great importance for Kashmiri Pandits. It is home to many types of fish, among which is the brown trout. It freezes during winter. During the summer season, the lake is surrounded by green lush meadows, where local shepherds graze their flocks of sheep and goats. The lake, with its scenic beauty, snow-covered mountains, gorges filled with small glaciers, and meadows with alpine flowers, is an attraction for the trekkers in the Kashmir Valley. It is fed by the Krishansar Lake and glaciers. The Vishansar Lake is the source of Kishanganga River, which flows northwards up to Badoab, and then westwards through Gurais, along the Line of Control. The Gadsar Lake lies some 9 km to the west, crossing Gadsar Pass.

Gallery

References

Lakes of Jammu and Kashmir
Geography of Ganderbal district
Tourist attractions in Ganderbal district